Edwin Walden was a Massachusetts politician who served as the 13th Mayor of Lynn, Massachusetts.

See also
 1876 Massachusetts legislature
 1877 Massachusetts legislature

Notes

1818 births
Members of the Massachusetts House of Representatives
Massachusetts city council members
Mayors of Lynn, Massachusetts
1889 deaths
19th-century American politicians